John Crawshay Wesley (19 January 1908 – 1946) was an English footballer who played as an inside forward.

Wesley began his career at non-league St Austell before playing league football for Gateshead and Bradford Park Avenue from 1933 to 1939. He played over 200 league and cup games during this period, scoring a total of 60 goals.

Sources

1908 births
1946 deaths
English footballers
Association football forwards
A.F.C. St Austell players
Gateshead F.C. players
Bradford (Park Avenue) A.F.C. players
English Football League players